George Porter (born 15 May 1989) is an English rugby union player for Worcester Warriors in the Aviva Premiership. He has played for England U18.

He plays as a prop.

George joined Plymouth Albion in 2009 and left in 2011, when he joined the Worcester Warriors.

References

External links
Worcester Warriors profile
https://web.archive.org/web/20120827035508/http://www.warriors.co.uk/warriors/matchcentre/players_warriors_first_team.php?player=92210&includeref=dynamic

1989 births
Living people
Worcester Warriors players
Birmingham & Solihull R.F.C. players
Plymouth Albion R.F.C. players
Rugby union players from Gloucester
Nottingham R.F.C. players
Ealing Trailfinders Rugby Club players
Cinderford R.F.C. players
Hartpury University R.F.C. players
Rugby union props